Esrom Yosef Immanuel is a Fijian politician and member of the Parliament of Fiji. He is a member of the People's Alliance.

He was selected as a PA candidate in the 2022 Fijian general election, and was elected to Parliament, winning 1751 votes. On 24 December 2022 he was appointed Assistant Minister for Finance in the coalition government of Sitiveni Rabuka.

References

Living people
People's Alliance (Fiji) politicians
Members of the Parliament of Fiji
Year of birth missing (living people)